Irshat (İrşat) is a rural locality (a village) in Gayniyamaksky Selsoviet, Alsheyevsky District, Bashkortostan, Russia. The population was 68 as of 2010. There is 1 street.

Geography 
Irshat is located 45 km southwest of Rayevsky (the district's administrative centre) by road. Stepanovka is the nearest rural locality.

References 

Rural localities in Alsheyevsky District